Justus Danckerts I (11 November 1635 in Amsterdam – 16 July 1701 in Amsterdam) was a Dutch engraver and print publisher who along with other members of the Danckerts family created one of the leading Dutch geographical map and atlas publishing houses.

Biography 
Justus Danckerts was the son of Cornelis Danckerts I (1603–1656), who established the Danckerts cartographic family business in Amsterdam. After producing in the early 1680s over 20 folio-sized atlas maps, he published in 1686–1887 the first Danckerts atlas. In 1690, another 26-sheet geographical atlas was published; between 1698 and 1700, a 60-sheet atlas was completed. Its map sheets and plates were used by various publishers until the middle of the 18th century.

Family 
His sons,  Theodorus Danckerts I (1663–1727) and  Cornelis Danckerts II (1664–1717) were prominent engravers and print makers, skillful in map plate engraving and etching.

Plates 
William III., Prince of Orange; afterwards King of England.
Casimir, King of Poland.
Seven plates of the Gates of Amsterdam.

Works 
 Nova totus terrarum orbis tabula ex officina Iusti Danckerts, Amsterdam. 1680. 
 Accuratissima Regnorum Sueciae, Daniae et Norvegiae Tabula. Danckerts, Amsterdam ca. 1700. digital
 Accuratissima Totius Regni Hispaniae Tabula. Danckerts, Amsterdam ca. 1700. digital
 Novissima et accuratissima XVII provinciarum Germaniæ inferioris tabula. Danckerts, Amsterdam ca. 1700. digital
 Novissima Regnorum Portugalliae et Algarbia Descriptio''. Danckerts, Amsterdam ca. 1700. digital

References

 

1635 births
1701 deaths
Engravers from Amsterdam